This is a list of films which placed number-one at the weekend box office in Belgium during 2018. Amounts are in American dollars.

Highest-grossing films

References

2018 in Belgium
2018
Belgium